The Ha-Iltzuk Icefield is an icefield in the central Pacific Ranges of the Coast Mountains in British Columbia, Canada. It is located on the west side of the Klinaklini River and the Waddington Range.

The southern half of the icefield is named the Silverthrone Glacier and flows west, joining the Klinaklini Glacier just above that glacier's terminus, where its outflow is short but very large, and joins the Klinaklini River within a few kilometres.  The Klinaklini Glacier constitutes the northern half of the icefield, and off its northwest edge a glacial tongue produces the head of the Machmell River.  The name Ha-Iltzuk Icefield does not appear in government gazettes. The term is almost certainly a phonetic spelling of hailtzaq - the Heiltsuk language pronunciation for the term Heiltsuk.

See also
 Heiltsuk
List of glaciers
Pacific Ranges
Lillooet Icecap
Homathko Icefield

References

Glaciers of the Pacific Ranges
Ice fields of British Columbia